Salt and Enson is a civil parish in the Borough of Stafford, Staffordshire, England.  It contains five listed buildings that are recorded in the National Heritage List for England. All the listed buildings are designated at Grade II, the lowest of the three grades, which is applied to "buildings of national importance and special interest".  The parish contains the village of Salt and the surrounding area.  The listed buildings consist of a farmhouse, two road bridges, one over the Trent and Mersey Canal, and the other over the River Trent, a former engine house, and a church.


Buildings

References

Citations

Sources

Lists of listed buildings in Staffordshire